Gl'innamorati (The lovers) is a comedy play by Venetian playwright Carlo Goldoni. It was published in 1759.

Synopsis
Milan, 18th century. It's a year since Eugenia Ridolfi, heiress of a ruined family, has begun meeting Fulgentius, young and rich middle-class man. They are deeply in love, but the relationship is troubled because of his impulsivity and, especially, her jealousy. For example, Eugenia does not bear Fulgentius to frequent his sister-in-law Clorinda, though he's obliged to(his brother has left for Genoa due to his job, and he must stay with her until the man is back). So they often break up, but equally often make up.

Meanwhile, count Roberto of Otricoli, a friend of Fabrizio's (the landlord with an obsession for art) arrives in Milan and visits the Ridolfis. Fabrizio, who doesn't want to be outdone, invites him to lunch, despite the disastrous economic situation of the family. Meanwhile, Eugenia makes it clear things with Roberto, who has fallen in love with her, telling him she loves another man. But Fulgentius, who does not know anything, is jealous, and threatens to commit suicide. His girlfriend stops him by openly declaring her love for him, and the two make up. But Fabrizio has also invited to lunch Clorinda: Eugenia, exasperated and jealous, insults the woman and storms away.

Lunch takes place dramatically (according to the servants Lisetta and Tognino, which peek from the lock) and shortly after the nth argument, Eugenia and Fulgentius break up - this time forever. The girl, to pique and revenge, accepts a proposal from Roberto: Fabrizio, who had also liked Fulgentius, now that the niece is engaged with a nobleman, forbids her to love and attend him again. The girl agrees, only to bitterly regret a couple of minutes later: Fulgentius indeed returns with good news for her. His brother has come back from Genoa: Clorinda is again under the protection of her husband, and the boy has the permission to marry the woman he loves, Eugenia. Eugenia, desperate, is forced to tell Fulgentius that she is now engaged: in the face of right accusations received from her ex-boyfriend, experiencing the blow, she faints. When found, her sister Flamminia will give her wonderful news: she told Roberto the situation and he broke the engagement with Eugenia. Fabrizio will be convinced too: Fulgentius will marry his niece without asking for a dowry.

Soon after the much longed-for marriage takes place.

Plays by Carlo Goldoni
1759 plays